Henry Clay Snodgrass (March 29, 1848April 22, 1931) was an American politician and a member of the United States House of Representatives for the 3rd congressional district of Tennessee.

Biography
Snodgrass was born on March 29, 1848 near Sparta, Tennessee in White County. He attended Sparta Academy, studied law at Cumberland University in Lebanon, Tennessee, and was admitted to the bar in 1870. He commenced practice in Sparta, Tennessee and engaged in agricultural pursuits.

Career
During the Civil War, Snodgrass served as a private in the Confederate Army. From 1878 to 1884, he was the attorney general of the fifth judicial circuit.

Snodgrass was elected as a Democrat to the 52nd and 53rd Congresses. He served from March 4, 1891 to March 3, 1895,  but he was not a successful candidate for re-election to the 54th Congress. He was a delegate to the Democratic National Convention in 1896. He resumed the practice of his profession in Sparta, Tennessee in White County.

Snodgrass moved to Gould, Oklahoma and engaged in agricultural pursuits.

Death
Snodgrass died on April 22, 1931 (age 83 years, 24 days) in Altus, Oklahoma. He is interred at Altus Cemetery. He was the uncle of fellow Tennessee congressman Charles Edward Snodgrass.

References

External links

1848 births
1931 deaths
People from Sparta, Tennessee
Cumberland University alumni
Tennessee lawyers
Confederate States Army soldiers
People of Tennessee in the American Civil War
People from Harmon County, Oklahoma
Democratic Party members of the United States House of Representatives from Tennessee
19th-century American politicians